Servet Teufik Agaj was an Albanian former football player who played for Skënderbeu Korçë during the 1930s, where he won the club's first ever Albanian Championship in 1933, a season in which he also finished as top scorer with 7 goals in 5 games.

Honours
Albanian Superliga: 1
 1933

References 

Possibly living people
Footballers from Korçë
Albanian footballers
People from Maliq
Association football forwards
Albanian men's footballers
KF Skënderbeu Korçë players
Kategoria Superiore players